Canned Feud is a 1951 Warner Bros. Looney Tunes animated short directed by Friz Freleng. The short was released on February 3, 1951, and stars Sylvester.

Plot
Sylvester's owners, Sam and Violet, go on vacation to California, forgetting to put him outside. Sylvester abruptly notices this, finding that he is locked inside an empty house, devoid of food and with no milk being delivered for two weeks. He finds a cupboard full of canned tuna and cat food, but discovers that he also needs a can opener. He seemingly cannot find one, until he sees a mouse with it. Sylvester begs for the mouse to give it to him, but he throws it into his hole. Sylvester frantically tries and fails to retrieve it, and the mouse saunters away. Furious, Sylvester angrily gives chase to the mouse and crashes into the mouse hole.

Sylvester tries vainly to open a can of tuna by beating it against the floor and jumping on it. When this doesn't work, he tries to chop it with an axe, but just as he swings, the axe blade flies off the handle and out through the mail slot. The mouse continues to taunt Sylvester and tosses the can opener out into the open, but he ends up crashing into the wall again. Next, Sylvester tries using an unbent metal coat hanger to retrieve the can opener, however the mouse hooks it to a live wire and Sylvester receives an electric shock causing his fur to fry off. Sylvester then sets up to drop a piano on the can, just before the mouse taunts him again with offers for the can opener, prompting Sylvester to release his hold on the rope and dropping on himself. An attempt to cut a larger hole around the mouse's hole is foiled by the mouse cutting a hole beneath Sylvester's feet, causing him to fall into the basement.

A dynamite attempt predictably backfires after the mouse inflates and pops a paper bag, making Sylvester think the dynamite had already gone off, only to have the explosive go off in his face.  His following attempt, involving a vacuum, results in Sylvester being sucked in, along with hot coal from the fireplace, and clumsily tumbling down into the basement while trying to hit the mouse with a golf club. However, the angrily persistent cat returns with an armful of dynamite and fireworks which blows prematurely as he's lighting the fuse, resulting in a tremendous explosion.  Regardless, he does finally recover the can opener in the process. Going to the cupboard and cheering, "I got it!" along the way, he finds that the mouse has now locked it and has the key. Sylvester lets out a cry of frustration and faints while the mouse twirls the key.

Reception
Linda Simensky writes, "This cartoon, which stars Sylvester the Cat, is a showcase of masterful comic timing, pantomime acting and sustained hysteria. Thanks to the limited dialogue and simple narrative, Friz Freleng focuses on letting Sylvester act, react, and completely panic at the thought of no food for two weeks."

Voice cast
 Mel Blanc as Sylvester, Rat's Whistle, Sam
 Marian Richman as Violet (uncredited)

Home media
Canned Feud was released on DVD in 2003 as part of Looney Tunes Golden Collection: Volume 1.

References

External links

 

1951 films
1951 short films
1951 comedy films
1951 animated films
1950s English-language films
1950s Warner Bros. animated short films
American animated short films
American fantasy comedy films
American slapstick comedy films
Looney Tunes shorts
Sylvester the Cat films
Films about mice and rats
Films set in 1951
Short films directed by Friz Freleng
Films scored by Carl Stalling
Warner Bros. Cartoons animated short films